is a genre of texts that focus on issues of Japanese national and cultural identity.

The concept became popular after World War II, with books and articles aiming to analyze, explain, or explore peculiarities of Japanese culture and mentality, usually by comparison with those of Europe and North America. The literature is vast, ranging over such varied fields as sociology, psychology, anthropology, history, linguistics, philosophy, biology, chemistry and physics so in addition to the common generic word nihonjinron, a variety of topical subgenres exist, divided up by specific theme or subject-matter. For example:
 : "new theories on climate" (implying the influence of climate on peoples)
 : "theories on Japanese culture"
 : "theories on Japanese society"
 : "theories on Japan"
 : "theories on the Japanese economy"

Books written by non-Japanese authors may also be classed as nihonjinron, if they share, contribute to, or reflect the vision, premises, and perspectives characteristic of the Japanese genre.

History
Hiroshi Minami, one of the foremost scholars of the genre, states in his survey:

The roots of the nihonjinron be traced back at least to the kokugaku ("national studies") movement of the 18th century, with themes that are not dissimilar to those in the post-war nihonjinron.

Early themes

The problem of Japanese identity in much of the early period is in terms of the local traditions and the powerful influence of Chinese culture, for example the revolt of the anti-Buddhist Mononobe and Nakatomi clans against the pro-Buddhist Soga clan, which had sponsored the introduction of not only Buddhist metaphysics but also Chinese statecraft into Japan in the 6th century.

Later, Kitabatake Chikafusa (1293–1354) wrote his Jinnō Shōtōki ("Chronicles of the Authentic Lineages of the Divine Emperors") which defines Japan's superiority in terms of the divinity of its imperial line and the divinity of the nation itself (Shinkoku). The general drift of such works is to pull the abstract, universal language and thought of Japan's foreign models down to earth, to reframe it in Japanese conditions, among the illiterate population at large, and assert the special historical characteristics of Japan as opposed to the civilizations which had, until that time, endowed the country with the lineaments of a universalist culture.

In the 16th century European contacts with Japan gave rise to a considerable literature by travelers and foreign missionaries on the Japanese, their culture, behavior, and patterns of thinking. In turn this had some impact on Japanese self-images, when this material began to be read by many Japanese after the Meiji Restoration; and this tradition of cross-cultural discourse forms an important background component in the rise of the modern nihonjinron.

Kokugaku
Kokugaku, beginning as a scholarly investigation into the philology of Japan's early classical literature, sought to recover and evaluate these texts, some of which were obscure and difficult to read, in order to appraise them positively and harvest them to determine and ascertain what were the original indigenous values of Japan before the introduction of Chinese civilization. Thus the exploration of early classical texts like the Kojiki and the Man'yōshū allowed scholars of Kokugaku, particularly the five great figures of Keichū (1640–1701), Kada no Azumamaro (1669–1736), Kamo no Mabuchi (1697–1769), Motoori Norinaga (1730–1801) and Hirata Atsutane (1776–1843) to explore Japan's cultural differences with China, locate their sources in high antiquity, and deploy the results in a programmatic attempt to define the uniqueness of Japan against a foreign civilization. These scholars worked independently, and reached different conclusions, but by the 19th century were grouped together by a neo-Kokugakuist named Konakamura to establish the earliness of Japanese self-awareness. Implicitly or otherwise, they advocated a return to these ostensibly pristine ethnic roots, which involved discarding the incrustations of those Chinese cultural beliefs, social rites and philosophical ideas that had exercised a political ascendancy for over a millennium within Japan and had deeply informed the neo-Confucian ideology of the Tokugawa regime itself.

The irony was that the intellectual techniques, textual methods and cultural strategies used by nativist scholars against Confucianism borrowed heavily from currents in both Chinese thought (Taoist, Confucian and Buddhist) and their Japanese offshoots. Motoori, the greatest nativist scholar, is deeply indebted, for instance, to the thought of Ogyū Sorai  the most penetrating Confucian thinker of Tokugawa times. In similar wise, scholars detect in modern Japanese nationalism, of which the nihonjinron are the resonant if melodiously subdued, post-war echo, many features that derived from borrowings abroad, from the large resources of cultural nationalism mined in European countries during their own respective periods of nation-formation. Under the alias of assertions of difference, nationalisms, in Japan as elsewhere, borrow promiscuously from each other's conceptual hoards, and what may seem alien turns out often to be, once studied closely, merely an exotic variation on an all too familiar theme.

Meiji period
In the second half of the 19th century, under strong military and diplomatic pressure, and suffering from an internal crisis that led to the collapse of the Bakufu, Japan opened its ports, and subsequently the nation, to commerce with the outside world and reform that sought to respond vigorously to the challenges of modern industrial polities, as they were remarked on by Japanese observers in the United States and Europe. The preponderant place of China as model and cultural adversary in the cognitive models developed hitherto was occupied by the West. But, whereas Japan's traditional engagement with Chinese civilization was conducted in terms of a unilateral debate, now Japanese scholars and thinkers could read directly what Westerners, themselves fascinated by the 'exoticism' of Japanese culture, said and wrote of them. Japanese contact with, and responses to these emerging Western stereotypes, which reflected the superiority complex, condescension and imperial hauteur of the times, fed into Japanese debates on national identity. As Leslie Pincus puts it, speaking of a later phase:

There ensued an intense period of massive social and economic change, as, under the direction of a developmental elite, Japan moved from the closed world of centuries of Tokugawa rule (the so-called sakoku period) to Meiji Westernization, and, again in close conformity with the prevailing occidental paradigm, to imperialist adventurism with the growth of the colonialism. The Taishō period marked a slightly more 'liberal' turn, as the pendulum swung towards a renewed interest in the Western model ("Japan must undergo a second birth, with America as its new mother and France as its father").

Postwar period
Total economic, military and spiritual mobilization could not stave off defeat however, and slowly, under occupation, and then rapidly with its reasserted independence, Japan enjoyed a decades-long resurgence as global industrial and economic powerhouse until the crisis of the 1990s. The cultural patterns over this century long trajectory is one of a continuous oscillation between models of pronounced Westernization and traditionalist autarky. Between the two alternatives, attempts were frequently made to mediate a conciliatory third way which would combine the best of both worlds: .

The frequency of these chronic transitional upheavals engendered a remarkable intensity of debate about national directions and identity ( kokuminsei;  minzokusei), whose complexity over time renders a synthetic judgment or bird's-eye view of the literature in question rather difficult. A major controversy surrounds the question regarding the affiliation of the post-war nihonjinron theories with the prewar conceptualization of Japanese cultural uniqueness. To what degree, that is, are these meditations under democracy on Japanese uniqueness innocent reflections of a popular search for identity, and in what measure, if any, do they pick up from the instrumental ideology of Japaneseness developed by the government and nationalists in the prewar period to harness the energies of the nation towards industrialization and global imperium?

The questions are rendered more complex by the fact that in the early post-war period, the restoration of a 'healthy nationalism' was by no means something exclusive to right-wing cultural thinkers. These debates ranged from liberal center-left critics to radical Marxist historians.

Some scholars cite the destruction of many Japanese national symbols and the psychological blow of defeat at the end of World War II as one source of nihonjinron's enduring popularity, although it is not a uniquely 20th century phenomenon. In fact the genre is simply the Japanese reflex of cultural nationalism, which is a property of all modern nations. The trend of the tone of nihonjinron argument is often reflective of the Japanese society at the time. Peter N. Dale, covering the period analysed by the Nomura survey, distinguished three major phases in the development of post-war nihonjinron discourse:

First phase (1945–1960): Dominance of the Western model with a concomitant repudiation of Japanese specificity.
Second phase (1960–1970): Recognition of historical relativity, of certain defects in Western industrial society, and certain merits in Japanese traditions, as they are re-engineered in Japanese modernization.
Third phase (1970–?): Recognition of Japanese specificity as a positive model for a uniquely Japanese road towards modernity and its global outreach.

Tamotsu Aoki subsequently finessed the pattern by distinguishing four major phases in the post war identity discourse.

In Dale's proposal, this drift from negative uniqueness to positive evaluation of uniqueness is a cyclical trend, since he believes the same pattern can be detected in the literature on identity for the period from 1867 to 1945, from early Meiji times down to the end of World War Two. Nihonjinron, in Dale's view, recycle prewar Japanese nationalist rhetoric, and betray similar ends. For Aoki, contrariwise, they are natural movements in a national temper which seeks, as has been the case with other nations, its own distinctive path of cultural autonomy and social organization as Japan adapts itself to the global world order forged by the West.

During the early post-war period, most of nihonjinron discourses discussed the uniqueness of the Japanese in a rather negative, critical light. The elements of feudalism reminiscent of the Imperial Japan were all castigated as major obstacles to Japan's reestablishment as a new democratic nation. Scholars such as Hisao Ōtsuka, a Weberian sociologist, judged Japan with the measure of rational individualism and liberal democracy that were considered ideals in the U.S. and Western European nations back then. By the 1970s, however, with Japan enjoying a remarkable economic boom, Ōtsuka began to consider the 'feudal residues' in a positive light, as a badge of Japan's distinctive difference from the West (Ōtsuka, Kawashima, Doi 1976 passim). Nihonjinron books written during the period of high economic growth up to the bubble burst in the early 1990s, in contrast, argued various unique features of the Japanese as more positive features.

Specific theses

 The Japanese race is a unique isolate, having no known affinities with any other race. In some extreme versions, the race is claimed to be directly descended from a distinct branch of primates.
 This isolation is due to the peculiar circumstances of living in an  cut off from the promiscuous cross-currents of continental history, with its endless miscegenation of tribes and cultures. The island country in turn enjoys a  whose peculiar rhythms, the supposed fact for example that Japan alone has , color Japanese thinking and behaviour. Thus, human nature in Japan is, peculiarly, an extension of nature itself.
 The Japanese language has a unique grammatical structure and native lexical corpus whose idiosyncratic syntax and connotations condition the Japanese to think in peculiar patterns unparalleled in other human languages. The Japanese language is also uniquely vague. Foreigners who speak it fluently therefore, may be correct in their usage, but the thinking behind it remains inalienably soaked in the alien framework of their original language's thought patterns. This is the Japanese version of the Sapir–Whorf hypothesis, according to which grammar determines world-view.
As a result, the  cannot properly exist, since  will always prevail.

As cultural nationalism
Scholars such as Peter N. Dale (1986), Harumi Befu (1987), and Kosaku Yoshino (1992) view nihonjinron more critically, identifying it as a tool for enforcing social and political conformity. Dale, for example, characterizes nihonjinron as follows:

The emphasis on ingroup unity in nihonjinron writings, and its popularization during Japan's period of military expansion at the turn of the 20th century, has led many Western critics to brand it a form of ethnocentric nationalism. Karel van Wolferen echoes this assessment, noting that:

Overview of Arguments

Mainly from a research historical perspective 
Western society first learned about Japanese culture during the first encounter between the West and Japan, in 1543 during the Sengoku era, when Portuguese drifted to Tanegashima and introduced guns to the island. Eventually, Francis Xavier arrived in Japan, and his fellow Missionaries of the Jesuits wrote Treatise of Luís Fróis, S.J. (1585) on the contrast of the morals between Europe and Japan, History of Japan, and Alessandro Valignano's Tour of Japan Valignano. However, the reports were long buried due to the interruption of the Tokugawa shogunate's sakoku policy, and it was only during the long Edo period that the Modernization of Western society took a renewed interest in Japan's civilized society, Edo period and the opening of Japan to the outside world at the end of the 19th century. The rapid modernization of Japanese society after the Meiji Restoration led to increased attention for Japan as the first Asian and Colored country to achieve modernization.

Early Western studies of Japan were tinged with the same kind of exoticism and Orientalism as interest in other Oriental societies. However, the many accounts written by Western travellers and observers after the opening of Japan to the outside world reported similarities between the social structure of Japan and that of the West, and as Japan emerged as a military power, there was an increasing tendency to see Japan as similar to the West.

This Western interest in Japan is supported in part by the fact that, despite its highly modern success, it is considered to maintain a uniquely Japanese traditional society. However, there are different views on which characteristics belong to the uniquely Japanese tradition, the extent of their influence in Japanese society, and whether they have anything in common with other societies. Methodologically, there are two main perspectives: the structural perspective, based on an analysis of Japanese organisations and institutions, and the cultural anthropological perspective, based on Japanese behavioural and cultural tendencies.

The former, which drew on Max Weber's theory of bureaucracy, initially tended to look at the characteristics of Japanese society on a relatively small scale, but gradually adopted the latter approach, and today the prevailing perspective is that of Japan's unique institutional structure. In terms of research trends, the prevailing view is that Japan's institutional realities are to some extent related to its cultural patterns. Therefore, recent studies have more or less taken into account both of these two different perspectives.

Two aspects of successful modernization and cultural structure 

 <small>For more information on the modernization of Japan, see Meiji</small>
 <small>For more on the restorationist aspects of the political structure, see Emperor System, Kokutai</small>

It is almost a well-established view that the modernisation of Japan has been achieved at a phenomenal rate. With its victory in the Russo-Japanese War in 1905, it became one of the first great powers in Asia. Japanese society by this time had a systematic modern code, complete with a centralisation of bureaucratic control of the land and a hierarchy order. At the centre of this modern state, however, was the traditional Authority of the Emperor, who also played a role in national unity.

The Ideology of the Japanese Modern state had two aspects: modern and restoration. The modern emperor system, which was established by transforming traditional society, was advocated as the Restoration of the Monarchy (disambiguation) of Ancient. The ideology had two sides: utilitarianism and idealism. On the practical side, it encouraged a positive embrace of modern Western civilisation, while on the ideal side it promoted a view of morality that departed from Western economic materialism (wakon yosai). The latter idealism gradually gave way to a more restorationist tendency and a collective consciousness of Japan's unique national character, which became the concept of the "Kokutai". After World War II, this basic structure of collective consciousness has been maintained, although it has lost its myth appearance. However, despite the fact that it is said not to be actively supported by all Japanese citizens, Hatsumodes such as Shinto shrines are still active and have a very peaceful existence despite their ideological and religion-like duality. It has a dual ideological and religious nature, but a very calm existence.

 Understanding the different Japanese civilisations 

Apart from the grasp of comparative civilisation theory, which mainly focuses on the modern and contemporary period, there are also various other perspectives on civilised society in Japan.

Japanese Civilization  in the History of Civilizations
The main disciplines concerned with civilization are comparative civilization theory (comparative culture theory) and the history of civilization (cultural history). Among those who have discussed Japanese civilization in the field of civilization history are Karl Jaspers and Arnold J. Toynbee.

Jaspers defined Japan as a non-axial civilization on the periphery of an axial civilization, but focused on the success of such a peripheral society in modernizing itself. Toynbee attempted to view regional cultural spheres in terms of a centre-periphery relationship consisting of independent and satellite civilisations, and positioned Japan as a satellite civilisation of Chinese civilisation.

Philip Bagby judged that there were nine major civilizations, and that if China and Japan, and the Eastern Orthodox Church and Western Europe were to be classified as eleven.

Matthew Melko, after reviewing the material, unreasonably classifies Japan, China, India, Islam, and Western Europe where there is agreement.

 Huntington's theory of the clash of civilizations 

Samuel P. Huntington wrote Clash of Civilizations in 1998, in which he examined the clash of civilizations, dividing the world into eight civilizations and considering Japan as a single civilization. Huntington states that the Japanese civilization is a unique civilization that was established independently of the Chinese civilization between 100 and 400.

 Todd's classification of family structure 
In an analysis based on demographics and family structure, Emmanuel Todd points out that Japan's family structure (the direct line of descent with the eldest son taking over the parental family) and its effects are very European (especially in Germany and Sweden) and rejects Japan-specificity.

Todd also points out that Huntington's classification is too influenced by the concepts of religion and race.

 Trends in conservative discourse 
In relation to the Japanese history textbook controversies and the issue of historical awareness, a number of conservative discourses, such as the Japanese Society for History Textbook Reform, which advocates a liberal view of history, and Conservatism, which advocates a somewhat nationalist view of Japanese civilization. It describes Japanese civilization and society as older, more traditional and unique than is commonly believed (for example, placing its origins in the Jomon period), emphasizing its beauty and uniqueness to other cultures.

 Terumasa Nakanishi 
Nakanishi Terumasa's History of the Civilization of the Nation is a representative work in this regard. Relying on the sociology of culture approach of Alfred Weber, Nakanishi argues that Japan's unique civilizational process. In Japanese society, there are two kinds of civilization processes: a non-variable and stable civilization process and an abrupt and instantaneous civilization process, which are alternately repeated in History to build a unique society. This civilization process, which Nakanishi describes as existing since the Jomon period, emphasizes that the structure of traditional Japanese culture is very old and traditional. He also emphasises the role of the emperor in "Japanese civilisation" and states that he was an integral part of Japan's civilised society.

 Tsuneyasu Takeda 

 <small>For more information on polished stone tools, see Polished stone tools/Local polished stone axes'''</small>.

In his book "The Emperor's National History", he claims that the world's oldest ground stone (local polished stone axe) has been excavated from Japan, and that the appearance of this ground stone is a condition for culture and civilization, and that "Japanese civilization" appeared before the four major civilizations of the world. However, such a conditionalization does not mean that the Japanese civilization appeared before the four world civilizations. However, there are some criticisms of such a conditioning.

 Jomon Civilisation 
In the light of recent research at the Sannai-Maruyama Site, it has been suggested that the Jōmon civilization should be referred to as Ancient Civilization, and that it is comparable to the World's Four Great Civilizations.

While there has been a great deal of Mass media coverage of this theory of Jomon civilization, and a series of articles presenting similar points of view, There has been a multifaceted debate over the significance of the Sannai-Maruyama site.

 Counterarguments 

 For an overview, see History of East Asia, Kanji cultural sphere, and Zuanfu.
 <small>For its influence on traditional Japanese symbolism, see Imperial rituals, Japanese Buddhism, and Confucianism</small>

There is a view that the Japanese archipelago and the regions up to Mainland China, Korean Peninsula and Vietnam are part of the same Kulturkreis,. The prevailing view in Oriental and Japanese studies of ancient history is to emphasize the influence of the ancient Chinese dynasties on Japan's State formation and cultural structure. From this point of view, Japanese civilized society has been formed and developed through interaction with neighboring states. For example, the Tenmu dynasty and afterwards, and the important place it has occupied in the symbolic system of the emperor system since the Meiji era, has been influenced by the ritual system of the ancient Chinese dynasties, and the political philosophy of Japanese politicians often incorporates foreign Confucian ethics and Buddhist ideas. On the other hand, the uniqueness of civilized society in modern Japan has been pointed out.

See also

Bunmei-kaika
Asian values
Culture of Japan
Heita KawakatsuHonne and tatemaeInternational Research Center for Japanese StudiesIshin-denshinJapanese nationalism
JapanologyKokutaiNacirema 
National psychology
Takeshi UmeharaYamato-damashii Japanification
 Bunmei-kaika
 Japanese studies
 Axial Age
 Exceptionalism

References

Major Nihonjinron literature
Hearn, Lafcadio.1904.Japan:An Attempt at Interpretation.Dodo Press
Kuki, Shūzō (九鬼周造). 1930. 「いき」の構造 English tr. An Essay on Japanese Taste: The Structure of 'Iki. John Clark; Sydney, Power Publications, 1996.
Watsuji, Tetsurō (和辻哲郞). 1935. Fûdo (風土). Tokyo, Iwanami Shoten. trans. Geoffrey Bownas, as Climate. Unesco 1962.
 Japanese Ministry of Education (文部省). 1937. 國體の本義 (Kokutai no hongi). tr. as Kokutai no hongi. Cardinal principles of the national entity of Japan, Cambridge, MA: Harvard UP, 1949.
Nishida, Kitarō (西田幾多郞). 1940. 日本文化の問題 (Nihon Bunka no mondai). Tokyo.
Benedict, Ruth. 1946. The Chrysanthemum and the Sword: Patterns of Japanese Culture. Houghton Mifflin, Boston
Herrigel, Eugen. 1948. Zen in der Kunst des Bogenschiessens, = 1953 Zen in the Art of Archery. New York, NY. Pantheon Books.
Nakane, Chie (中根千枝). 1967. タテ社会の人間関係 (Human relations in a vertical society)  English tr Japanese Society, Weidenfeld & Nicolson, London, UK, 1970.
Mishima, Yukio (三島由紀夫). 1969. Bunka Bôeiron (文化防衛論, A Defense of Culture). Tokyo, Japan: Shinchôsha.
Doi, Takeo (土居健郎). 1971. 「甘え」の構造 (The Structure of 'Amae'). Tokyo, Japan: Kôbundô. trans.The Anatomy of Dependence Kodansha, Tokyo 1974
Singer, Kurt. 1973 Mirror, Sword and Jewel. Croom Helm, London
Izaya Ben-Dasan, ('translated' by Yamamoto Shichihei:山本七平) 1972  Nihonkyō ni tsuite (日本教について), Tokyo, Bungei Shunjû
Hisao, Ōtsuka, Takeyoshi, Kawashima, Takeo, Doi. 「Amae」to shakai kagaku.Tokyo, Kōbundō 1976
Vogel, Ezra F. 1978. Japan As Number One: Lessons for America.. Cambridge, MA: Harvard UP.
Reischauer, Edwin O. 1978. The Japanese. Cambridge, MA: Harvard UP.
Tsunoda, Tadanobu (角田忠信). 1978. Nihonjin no Nō (日本人の脳―脳の働きと東西の文化, The Japanese brain). Tokyo, Japan: Taishūkan Shoten (大修館書店) .
Murakami, Yasusuke (村上泰亮), Kumon Shunpei (公文俊平), Satō Seizaburō (佐藤誠三郎). 1979. The 'Ie' Society as a Civilization (文明としてのイエ社会) Tokyo, Japan: Chūō Kōronsha.
Dower, John W.War Without Mercy: Race and Power in the Pacific War.1986.
Berque, Augustin 1986. Le sauvage et l'artifice: Les Japonais devant la nature. Gallimard, Paris.
Tamura Keiji (田村圭司) 2001.  Futatabi 「Nihonjin」tare！, (『再び「日本人」たれ！』) Takarajimasha Shinsho、Tokyo
 Takie Sugiyama Lebra 2004 The Japanese Self in Cultural Logic, University of Hawai'I Press, Honolulu
Macfarlane, Alan.Japan Through the Looking Glass. 2007.

Critical bibliography
 Amino, Yoshihiko (網野善彦) 1993 Nihonron no shiza: Rettō no shakai to kokka (日本論の視座) Tokyo, Shôgakkan
 Amino, Yoshihiko (網野善彦). 1978 Muen, kugai, raku: Nihon chūsei no jiyū to heiwa (無縁・公界・楽. 日本中世の自由と平和:Muen, kugai, raku: Peace and freedom in medieval Japan), Tokyo, Heibonsha
 Aoki Tamotsu (青木保) Bunka no hiteisei 1988 (文化の否定性) Tokyo, Chūō Kōronsha
 Aoki, Tamotsu (青木保) 1990. 'Nihonbunkaron' no Hen'yō (「日本文化論」の変容, Phases of Theories of Japanese Culture in transition). Tokyo, Japan: Chūō Kōron Shinsha.
 Befu, Harumi (別府春海) 1987 Ideorogī toshite no nihonbunkaron (イデオロギーとしての日本人論, Nihonjinron as an ideology). Tokyo, Japan: Shisō no Kagakusha.
 Benedict, Ruth. 1946. The Chrysanthemum and the Sword : Patterns of Japanese Culture. Boston, Houghton Mifflin.
 Benesch, Oleg. Inventing the Way of the Samurai: Nationalism, Internationalism, and Bushido in Modern Japan. Oxford: Oxford University Press, 2014.
 Berque, Augustin. 1986 Le sauvage et l'artifice: Les Japonais devant la nature. Paris, Gallimard.
 Burns, Susan L., 2003 Before the Nation - Kokugaku and the Imagining of Community in Early Modern Japan, Duke University Press, Durham, London.
 Dale, Peter N. 1986. The Myth of Japanese Uniqueness Oxford, London. Nissan Institute, Croom Helm.
 Dale, Peter N. 1994 'Nipponologies (Nihon-ron. Nihon-shugi' in Augustin Berque (ed.) Dictionnaire de la civilisation japonaise. Hazan, Paris pp. 355–6.
 Gayle, Curtis Anderson, 2003 Marxist History and Postwar Japanese Nationalism, RoutledgeCurzon, London, New York
 Gill, Robin D 1985 Nihonjinron Tanken (日本人論探険) Tokyo, TBS Britannica.
 Gill, Robin D. 1984Omoshiro Hikaku-bunka-kō, (おもしろ比較文化考) Tokyo, Kirihara Shoten.
 Gill, Robin D. 1985 Han-nihonjinron ((反日本人論)) Tokyo, Kōsakusha.
 Hijiya-Kirschnereit, Irmela 1988 Das Ende der Exotik Frankfurt am Main, Suhrkamp
 Kawamura, Nozomu (河村望) 1982 Nihonbunkaron no Shûhen (日本文化論の周辺, The Ambiance of Japanese Culture Theory), Tokyo: Ningen no Kagakusha
 Mazzei, Franco, 1997. Japanese Particularism and the Crisis of Western Modernity, Ca' Foscari University of Venice.
 Miller, Roy Andrew 1982 Japan's Modern Myth: The Language and Beyond, New York and Tokyo: Weatherhill.
 Minami Hiroshi (南博) 1980 Nihonjinron no keifu (日本人論の系譜) Tokyo, Kōdansha.
 Mouer, Ross & Sugimoto, Yoshio, Images of Japanese Society, London: Routledge, 1986
 Nomura Research Institute. 1979. Sengo Nihonjinron Nenpyō (戦後日本人論年表, Chronology of post-war Nihonjinron). Tokyo, Japan: Nomura Research Institute.
 Sugimoto Yoshio (杉本良夫) 1993 Nihonjin o yameru hōhō, Tokyo, Chikuma Bunko.
 Sugimoto, Yoshio & Ross Mouer (eds.) 1989 Constructs for Understanding Japan, Kegan Paul International, London and New York.
 Sugimoto, Yoshio (杉本良夫) and Mouer, Ross.(eds.) 1982 Nihonjinron ni kansuru 12 shô (日本人論に関する12章) Tokyo, Gakuyō Shobō
 Sugimoto, Yoshio (杉本良夫)1983 Chō-kanri rettô Nippon (超管理ニッボン, Nippon. The Hyper-Control Archipelago) Tokyo, Kōbunsha.
 Sugimoto, Yoshio and Mouer, Ross. 1982 Nihonjin wa 「Nihonteki」ka (日本人は「日本的」か) Tokyo, Tōyō Keizai Shinpōsha
 Sugimoto, Yoshio and Mouer, Ross. 1995. Nihonjinron no Hōteishiki (日本人論の方程式, the Equation of Nihonjinron). Tokyo, Japan: Chikuma Shobō
 Van Wolferen, Karel. 1989. The Enigma of Japanese power. Westminster, MD: Knopf.
 Yoshino, Kosaku. 1992. Cultural Nationalism in Contemporary Japan: A Sociological Enquiry. London, UK: Routledge.

Internet
 Community, Democracy, and Performance: Nihonjinron
 Gregory Shepherd: "Nihonjinron"
 Dissertation preview - Globalization and Japanese animation: Ethnography of American college students
 Maintaining Identities: Discourses of Homogeneity in a Rapidly Globalizing Japan, article by Chris Burgess in the electronic journal of contemporary Japanese studies, 19 April 2004.
 Nihonjinron.com: A look at contemporary and historical issues affecting Japanese national and cultural identity.
 Chrysanthemum's Strange Life: Ruth Benedict in Postwar Japan article by Sonia Ryang on the role of The Chrysanthemum and the Sword'' in Nihonjinron
 Japan: Locked in the Self-assertive Discourse of National Uniqueness?

References 

 S. N. Eisenstadt, translated by Junichi Umetsu et al. in Japan: Comparative Civilization Studies, 1,2, Iwanami Shoten, 2004.
 Yoko Kudo, Introduction to the Critique of European Civilization: Colonies, Republics and Orientalism, University of Tokyo Press, 2003.
 Reiko Shimokawa, The Confucianism of Kitabatake Chikabo, Perikansha, 2001.
 Hiroyuki Tamakake, Studies in the History of Japanese Medieval Thought, Perikansha, 1998.
 Terumasa Nakanishi, A History of National Civilization, Fusosha, 2003.
 Sadao Nishijima, The Ancient East Asian World and Japan, Iwanami Modern Library, 2000.
 Takeshi Hamashita, The Tribute System and Modern Asia, Iwanami Shoten, 1997.
 Yuko Yoshino, The Structure of the Emperor's Accession Ceremony, Kobundo, 1987.
 Samuel P. Huntington, The Clash of Civilizations and Japan in the 21st Century, translated by Suzuki Shuzei, Shueisha Shinsho, 2000.
 Diversification of the World: Family Structure and Modernity, translated by Emmanuel Todd and Fumitaka Ogino.

Related Documents 

 Tadao Umesao, What is Japan: The Formation and Development of Modern Japanese Civilization, Japan Broadcasting Corporation Press, 1986.
 Umesao Tadao, 77 Keys to Japanese Civilization, Bungeishunju, 2005.
 Shinichiro Fujio, The Jomon Controversy, Kodansha, 2002.
 Heita Kawakatsu, Japanese Civilization and the Modern West: Rethinking the "Closed Country", Japan Broadcasting Corporation Press, 1991.
 Samuel P. Huntington, The Clash of Civilizations, Shueisha, 1998.
 Ryōtarō Shiba, The Shape of Japanese Civilization: Selected Dialogues of Ryōtarō Shiba (5), Bungeishunju, 2006.
 Ryōtarō Shiba, The Shape of Japanese Civilization: Selected Dialogues of Ryōtarō Shiba, Bungeishunju, 2006.
 Kotaro Takemura, Solving the Mystery of Japanese Civilization: Hints for Thinking about the 21st Century, Seiryu Shuppan, 2003.
 Terumasa Nakanishi, The Rise and Fall of Japanese Civilization: This Country at the Crossroads, PHP Institute, 2006.
 Tetsuo Yamaori, "What is Japanese Civilization?", Kadokawa Shoten, 2004.
 Philip Bagby, Culture and History, translated by Arata Yamamoto and Biao Tsutsumi, Sobunsha, 1976.
 Shuji Yagi, The Individuality of Japan: An Introduction to the Theory of Japanese Civilization, Ikuhosha, 2008.
 The Association for the Creation of New History Textbooks, New History Textbooks, Fusosha, 2001.
 Nishio Mikiji, New History Textbook Wo Tsukuru Kai, Kokumin no Rekishi (History of the People), Sankei Shimbun News Service, 1999.

Japanese studies
Society of Japan
Ideologies
National identities